Rock 'N' Roll is the third album by the Canadian alternative rock band Social Code. It was released on September 1, 2009, with the first single "Satisfied" released on iTunes on July 28, 2009.

The album, which contains 11 tracks, was produced by John Travis, who had previously worked with such artists as Kid Rock, Buckcherry and Sugar Ray, and was said to be heavier than the band's previous pop punk efforts, and influenced by such bands as Led Zeppelin, The Rolling Stones, Cheap Trick, Bruce Springsteen and The Black Crowes. Mike Fraser (AC/DC, Hinder, Aerosmith) mixed the album.

Track listing

iTunes Exclusive

Singles
"Satisfied"
"Nothing Left to Lose"
"I'm Not Okay"

Personnel
Travis Nesbitt - lead vocals 
Morgan Gies - lead & rhythm guitars
Logan Jacobs - bass
Ben Shillabeer - drums, percussion
Produced by John Travis
Mixed by Mike Fraser
Additional Production on “Satisfied” & “I’m Not Ok” by Logan Jacobs

References

2009 albums
Social Code albums